Tumak is a rural locality (a selo) and the administrative center of Tumaksky Selsoviet of Volodarsky District, Astrakhan Oblast, Russia. The population was 2,539 as of 2010. There are 19 streets.

Geography 
Tumak is located 25 km south of Volodarsky (the district's administrative centre) by road. Sizy Bugor is the nearest rural locality.

References 

Rural localities in Volodarsky District, Astrakhan Oblast